Pardosa lapidicina, the stone spider, is a species of wolf spider in the family Lycosidae. 

location: It is found in the United States and Canada. primary near water. 

Description: Around 6-9 mm, dark-colored wolf spider, 30-70 mg in size when fully matured.

A study by Douglass Morse at Brown University focused in on the wolf spider Pardosa lapidicina Emerton. Studying their behavior, commonly found on cobble beaches above the tide line about Narragansett Bay, Rhode Island, USA and migration patterns among the tidelines. The species size was found to be 30 individuals/0.5 m along the shoreline; making them a common spider in this area. Their migration patterns showed they stayed close to the beach, during winter months (April-November). However in warmer months a third of the population moves with diurnal tides. The stone spider occupies both the open beach in addition to the beach with salt-marsh grass. They maintain a sit-and-wait strategy which sun-basking frequently, capturing more than one prey per day. Their diet also includes  Diptera, Collembola, and amphipods.

References

External links

 

lapidicina
Articles created by Qbugbot
Spiders described in 1885